Kaua can refer to:

Kaua, Yucatán, locality in Mexico, seat of the below municipality
Kaua Municipality, Yucatán, Mexico
KAUA, former call sign of KBRA (95.9 FM), a radio station in Freer, Texas, United States

Persons
Atkin Kaua (b. 1996), a Solomon Islands footballer
Toswel Kaua (1947–2010), a Solomon Islands politician
Kaua (footballer) (b. 2003), the Brazilian footballer Kauã Jesus Tenório, commonly known as Kauã

See also
Kauai, one of the main Hawaiian Islands